Leary Lee Lentz  (born February 23, 1945 in Clarkton, Missouri) is an American former professional basketball player. After playing college basketball at the University of Houston, the 6 ft 6 in forward played for two seasons in the American Basketball Association with the Houston Mavericks and the New York Nets.

External links
Career ABA stats @ basketball-reference.com

1945 births
Living people
American men's basketball players
Basketball players from Missouri
Forwards (basketball)
Houston Cougars men's basketball players
Houston Mavericks players
New York Nets players
People from Dunklin County, Missouri